The 1960 Ohio State Buckeyes football team represented the Ohio State University in the 1960 Big Ten Conference football season. The Buckeyes compiled a 7–2 record.

Schedule

Roster

Game summaries

SMU

USC

at Illinois

Purdue

Wisconsin

at Michigan State

Indiana

at Iowa

Michigan

1961 Pro draftees

References

Ohio State
Ohio State Buckeyes football seasons
Ohio State Buckeyes football